The Government of the Sakha Republic (Yakutia) under the purview of the Government of Russia exercises executive power and administrative control over the Sakha Republic (Yakutia). Members of government are Head of the Sakha Republic (Yakutia), Chairman of the Sakha Republic (Yakutia) and Cabinet Ministers. Its legal framework is governed both by the Constitution of the Sakha Republic (Yakutia) signed on April 2, 1992 and the Constitution of the Russian Federation.

References

Politics of the Sakha Republic
Sakha Republic
Government of the Arctic
Indigenous affairs ministries